Major General Charles Trueman Lanham (September 14, 1902 – July 20, 1978), known as "Buck", was an author, poet, and professional soldier in the  United States Army, winning 14 decorations in his career. After retiring from the military, he was active in corporate business. He is the model for one of Ernest Hemingway's heroes, and in life was a close friend of the author.

Military life 

Lanham was born in Washington D. C. He attended Eastern High School and graduated from West Point in 1924.  He was a short story writer and published poet (writing sonnets for several magazines) as well as a soldier. He included among his many military adventures the command of the 22nd Infantry Regiment in Normandy in July 1944, and was the first American officer to lead a break through the Siegfried Line on September 14, 1944, near Buchet. These developments were described by Hemingway in his article "War in the Siegfried Line". He led a breakout in the Battle of the Bulge after surviving a bloody ordeal in the Battle of Hurtgen Forest. Lanham earned the Distinguished Service Cross for his actions in the Huertgen Forest. The citation for the medal reads:

It was in the Normandy battles that Lanham and Ernest Hemingway first met, and Hemingway later went with Lanham to Huertgen. Hemingway was writing battlefield stories for the American audience for Collier's and sought assignment with Lanham's regiment. Hemingway described Lanham as "The finest and bravest and most intelligent military commander I have known."

One of his least admired decisions was came in the awarding of the Combat Infantry Men's Badge. Congress had authorized that it be awarded retroactively to June 6, 1944, D-Day. Lanham rejected this date and made effective no earlier than August 10, 1944, which deprived the men of an additional $10 per month for the full period in which they fought. His reason "What ever happened in this regiment before I took command does not concern me."

Post-military life

Lanham retired from the military at the end of 1954 as a major general, and joined the Pennsylvania-Texas Corporation of Colt's Patent Firearms. He resigned in 1958 and joined Xerox in 1960 as Vice President for Government Relations, retiring from that post at the end of 1970. He died on July 20, 1978, in Chevy Chase, Maryland, from cancer at the age of 76. He is buried in Arlington National Cemetery.

In fiction
Colonel "Buck" Lanham was one of the models for the character Colonel Cantwell in Hemingway's novel Across the River and Into the Trees, along with Charles Sweeny and Hemingway himself.

References

External links
Charles T. Lanham Papers, 1916-1978 (mostly 1944-1978) archival collection at the Seeley G. Mudd Manuscript Library
Hell in the Forest: The 22d Infantry Regiment in the Battle of Hurtgen Forest
Arlington National Cemetery Lanham
Jacob A. Stein
Hemingway Archive
Generals of World War II

1902 births
1978 deaths
Military personnel from Washington, D.C.
Recipients of the Distinguished Service Cross (United States)
Burials at Arlington National Cemetery
United States Military Academy alumni
Recipients of the Distinguished Service Medal (US Army)
People from Washington, D.C.
United States Army generals of World War II
United States Army generals
Eastern High School (Washington, D.C.) alumni